Emma Goldman in America is a biography of Emma Goldman by historian Alice Wexler originally published as Emma Goldman: An Intimate Life in 1984. It covers the first five decades of Goldman's life. Wexler published a second volume on the remainder: Emma Goldman in Exile (1989).

Bibliography

External links 
 Emma Goldman in America full text at the Internet Archive
 Emma Goldman: An Intimate Life full text at the Internet Archive

1984 non-fiction books
Biographies of Emma Goldman
English-language books
Pantheon Books books